Martín Zimmerman is an American bilingual (English and Spanish) playwright.

Zimmerman grew up speaking both languages. He attended Duke University, graduating with a BS summa cum laude in theater studies and economics. He later attended University of Texas at Austin and received a MFA in playwriting.

Plays 
Many of Zimmerman's plays have been performed for workshops and audiences alike winning awards and recognition.
 Seven Spots on the Sun 2009–Present
 White Tie Ball 2009-2013
 The Solid Sand Below 2012-2013
 Let Me Count the Ways 2014-2015 
 The Making of a Modern Fold Hero 2011
 Stranger (working title) 
 In the Event of Capture 
 Three Movements
 Coffee, Olive and Everything Between
 Foreign Tongue
 Teen Superhero Squad
 The Trial of Winter
 On the Exhale 2015-2016

Recognition 
 Terrence McNally New Play Award
 Steinberg/ATCA New Play Award Citation
 Humanitas Prize New Voices Award 2013
 McKnight Advancement Grant 2013
 Sky Cooper New American Play Prize 2013
 Carl Djerassi Playwriting Fellowship
 National New Play Network Smith Prize
 Alliance of Latino Theater Artists (ALTA) Artist of the Month

Venues 
 Goodman Theater- Chicago, IL
 Cincinnati Playhouse In the Park- Cincinnati, OH
 Oregon Shakespeare Festival- Ashland, OR
 La Jolla Playhouse- San Diego, CA
 Roundabout Underground- NYC, NY
 New York Theatre Workshop- NYC, NY
 Victory Gardens Theater- Chicago, IL
 Philadelphia Theatre Company- Philadelphia, PA
 Marin Theatre Company- San Francisco, CA
 The Playwrights' Center- Minneapolis, MN
 Alliance Theatre- Atlanta, GA
 A.C.T. (Seattle)
PlayPenn- Philadelphia, PA
 Icicle Creek Theatre Festival- Leavenworth, WA
 American Theater Company- Chicago, IL
 The Theatre @ Boston Court
 Chicago Dramatists- 
 Primary Stages- NYC, NY 
 Teatro Vista- Chicago, IL
 Seven Devils Playwrights Conference
 Illinois Shakespeare Festival- Bloomington, IL
 Borderlands Theater - Tucson, AZ
 Source Festival- Washington DC
 The Gift Theatre- Chicago, IL
 Duke University- Durham, NC
 The University of Texas- Austin
 Red Tape Theatre- Chicago, IL

References

Living people
Year of birth missing (living people)
21st-century American dramatists and playwrights